Rajesultanpur or Raje Sultanpur is a town and nagar panchayat in Ambedkar Nagar district in the Indian state of Uttar Pradesh.

Demographics
 India census, Population of children with age 0–6 years is 16636 which makes up 32.32% of total population of Rajesultanpur. Average Sex Ratio of Rajesultanpur is 1090 Females (per 1000 Males)  which is higher than Uttar Pradesh state average of 912 Females. Child Sex Ratio of Rajesultanpur as per census is 1009 (per 1000 Males), which is also higher than Uttar Pradesh average of 902 Females.

Rajesultanpur has higher literacy rate contrasted with Uttar Pradesh. In 2011, literacy rate of Rajesultanpur was 90.42% contrasted to 67.68% of Uttar Pradesh. In Rajesultanpur Male literacy stands at 97.95% while female literacy rate was 82.78%.

Rajesultanpur' Town population is 28632.

Transportation

By Rail
The rail connections are used primarily for passenger trains but also as goods transportation through Akbarpur Railway Station and Faizabad Junction. Rajesultanpur is around 120 km from Varanasi, 250 km from Lucknow, 120 km from Faizabad; 113 km from Ayodhya and 60 km from Gorakhpur. Rajesultanpur connected in future via Purvanchal Expressway with four lane to Gorakhpur.

By Air
The nearest airports are Ayodhya Airport, Varanasi Airport and Chaudhary Charan singh International Airport, Lucknow.

By Road
Frequent government bus services are not available to nearby towns and cities, although many private travel agencies run frequent bus services to Azamgarh and Faizabad such as SBS (Singh Bus Service). For short journeys, jeeps and cars are the common means of transportation. For internal transport, the rickshaw is very common.

Highways
 NH 233A
 NH 233B

Roads
 Rajesultanpur -Tanda Road
 Rajesultanpur -Maharajganj-Kaptanganj-Azamgarh Road
 Rajesultanpur -Deulpur
 Rajesultanpur -Sikariganj Road
 Rajesultanpur -Sabitpur-Doharighat Road
 Rajesultanpur -Atroliya Road

Education
 SLJB PG College
 BBS PG College
 RMRS PG College

See also
Ghughurpatti
Ambedkar Nagar
Faizabad
Ayodhya

References 

 
Cities and towns in Ambedkar Nagar district
Awadh
Faizabad division